The 1920 Oglethorpe Stormy Petrels football team represented Oglethorpe University in the sport of American football during the 1920 college football season. This was one of the first of Oglethorpe's seasons with a grown up program; they joined the Southern Intercollegiate Athletic Association after the season. Oglethorpe proved itself against some of the toughest opponents. Despite a loss to Georgia Tech, Oglethorpe was still able to boast that it was the only team to hold Tech from scoring on their touchdown line and were able to make a stop. Other impressive games were wins over Florida and Mercer.

The season marked the first under Jogger Elcock, who retained Kirby Malone as an assistant coach from the previous year. Johnny Knox was the team captain.

Schedule

References

Oglethorpe
Oglethorpe Stormy Petrels football seasons
Oglethorpe Stormy Petrels football